Building Back Better (BBB) is a strategy aimed at reducing the risk to the people of nations and communities in the wake of future disasters and shocks. The BBB approach integrates disaster risk reduction measures into the restoration of physical infrastructure, social systems and shelter, and the revitalisation of livelihoods, economies and the environment.

BBB has been described in the United Nations' Sendai Framework for Disaster Risk Reduction document, which was agreed on at the Third UN World Conference on Disaster Risk Reduction held on March 14–18, 2015, in Sendai, Japan. It was adopted by UN member states as one of four priorities in the Sendai Framework for disaster recovery, risk reduction and sustainable development. The UN General Assembly adopted this document on June 3, 2015.

Introduction of the concept to the UN 
The term "build back better" was first introduced to UN at the United Nations Economic and Social Council (ECOSOC) in July 2005 by former United States President Bill Clinton, the Secretary-General’s Special Envoy for Tsunami Recovery. Clinton first visited Aceh in May 2005 in his role as Special Envoy and had earlier visited Aceh in February 2005 with former US President George W. Bush.  Clinton's May 2005 visit included meetings with the World Bank, Bureau for Reconstruction and Rehabilitation of Aceh and Nias (Badan Rehabilitasi dan Rekonstruksi, BRR) as well as multilaterals and civil society.

At the opening speech of the Third UN World Conference on Disaster Risk Reduction, Shinzo Abe, Prime Minister of Japan, stated: "The word of "Build Back Better" sounds like a new concept, but this is common sense to the Japanese people, coming from our historical experiences in recovering from disaster and preparing for the future, and it has become an important part of the culture of Japan."

During the negotiation period for the Sendai Framework, the concept of "Build Back Better" was proposed by the Japanese delegation as a holistic concept which states: "The principle of 'Build Back Better' is generally understood to use the disaster as a trigger to create more resilient nations and societies than before. This was through the implementation of well-balanced disaster risk reduction measures, including physical restoration of infrastructure, revitalization of livelihood and economy/industry, and the restoration of local culture and environment". The concept was fully agreed as one of the most important concepts among each state's delegates and embedded into the Sendai Framework.

This concept was included in chapter 7 of the book Disaster Risk Reduction for Economic Growth and Livelihood, Investing in Resilience and Development: "Recovery and reconstruction: An opportunity for sustainable growth through 'build back better'". BBB had been used by people involved in the recovery process from natural disasters, but had not been clearly described as a holistic concept before this book.

Concept 
BBB has its roots in the improvement of land use, spatial planning and construction standards through the recovery process. The concept has expanded to represent a broader opportunity by building greater resilience in recovery by systematically addressing the root causes of vulnerability. However, the term was actually first coined in Indonesia by the World Bank and BRR following the 2004 Indian Ocean Tsunami in early stocktaking reports and briefing the UN Special Envoy Clinton. Specifically, the term was well used  in both the preliminary stocktake of May 2005 and the Brief for the Coordination Forum Aceh and Nias (CFAN) of October 2005.
Thereafter, the term caught global attention in 2006 during the 2004 Indian Ocean Tsunami relief effort, where the UN Special Envoy Report offered ten key propositions for BBB:
 Governments, donors, and aid agencies must recognize that families and communities drive their own recovery.
 Recovery must promote fairness and equity.
 Governments must enhance preparedness for future disasters.
 Local governments must be empowered to manage recovery efforts, and donors must devote greater resources to strengthening government recovery institutions, especially at the local level.
 Good recovery planning and effective coordination depend on good information.
 The UN, World Bank, and other multilateral agencies must clarify their roles and relationships, especially in addressing the early stage of a recovery process.
 The expanding role of NGOs and the Red Cross/ Red Crescent Movement carries greater responsibilities for quality in recovery efforts.
 From the start of recovery operations, governments and aid agencies must create the conditions for entrepreneurs to flourish.
 Beneficiaries deserve the kind of agency partnerships that move beyond rivalry and unhealthy competition.
 Good recovery must leave communities safer by reducing risks and building resilience.

The phrase was used in 2009 by former President Bill Clinton while referring to Haiti after the political upheaval and storms of 2008.  It was reiterated by UN Sec. Gen. Ban Ki-Moon in February 2010 with reference to Haiti after the 2010 earthquake.

The recently researched book by Mannakkara, Wilkinson and Potangaroa called Resilient Post Disaster Recovery through Building Back Better developed a sound framework for BBB, including indicators that have been tested in numerous countries. In the book, the authors argue for a holistic approach incorporating disaster risk reduction activities with community engagement, effective monitoring and implementation.

For a critical account of the concept and its usage in the context of attempts by states, multilateral agencies and NGOs to use disasters for projects of neoliberal enclosure and disaster capitalism, see Raja Swamy's "Building Back Better in India: Development, NGOs, and Artisanal Fishers after the 2004 Tsunami"  Swamy calls attention to how narratives of betterment dominate official discourses of disaster recovery, linking recovery with the needs and goals of capital while aiding in the further dispossession and marginalization of affected populations.

Applications 
During the reconstruction from the earthquake of Central Java in March 2006, the Japan International Cooperation Agency Reconstruction team used this concept to rebuild houses. They used earthquake-resistant technology and constructed more than 100,000 strengthened houses within two years under the leadership of Java Special Province.

After the major disaster in Java, international donors collaborated on a report: the Post Disaster Needs Assessment (PDNA). In the PDNA for Tropical Storm Ondoy and Typhoon Pepeng in the Philippines, PDNA team member Takeya Kimio from the Asian Development Bank strongly recommended BBB in disaster recovery.  wanted to make sure that BBB was first used in the Philippines government reconstruction policy document. BBB was also clearly written as a catchphrase on the first page of the document titled "Reconstruction Assistance on Yolanda".

After the Sendai Framework for Disaster Risk Reduction was finalised, the performance indicators were defined as: "The use of the recovery, rehabilitation, and reconstruction phases after a disaster to increase the resilience of nations and communities through integrating disaster risk reduction measures into the restoration of physical infrastructure and societal systems, and into the revitalization of livelihoods, economies and the environment. Annotation: The term “societal” will not be interpreted as a political system of any country."

Benefits

Preventing losses

In India, super-cyclone BOB06 killed more than 10,000 people in 1999. Additionally, the OSDMA invested in advanced early warning systems. When Odisha was hit by Cyclone Phailin in 2013, 50 people were killed—less than 1% of BOB06's casualties.

Local economy stimulation

In Madagascar, farmers benefited as much as 4.5 times their income after the risk of flooding was reduced through watershed protection in Mantadia National Park. In India, following the 2001 Gujarat earthquake, the Self-Employed Women's Association (SEWA) set up learning centres for local women to facilitate recovery which included tools, techniques and information about government schemes. These centres sustained the economic activities of women and have served as focal points during flood recovery since the earthquake.

Other benefits 

The benefits of BBB extend beyond risk reduction. In Malaysia, the government did not only save an estimated cost of US$300,000/km by maintaining the mangrove swamps intact for storm protection and flood control, but also lowered the temperature in the area.

Sendai Framework Priority for Action

In 2015, the Sendai Framework explicitly identified Building Back Better in recovery, reconstruction, and rehabilitation.

The United Nations Office for Disaster Risk Reduction has issued a volume of its Words into Action guidelines for BBB. While there can be no standardized blueprint for building back better, the guidelines offer step-by-step guidance on developing disaster recovery frameworks, pre-disaster recovery planning and post-disaster needs assessment.

See also 

 Disaster capitalism

References

Disaster recovery